Varas may refer to:

Places
Varas, Afghanistan
Waras District, a district in Bamyan Province, Afghanistan 
Varas, Argentina
Varas, Brazil
Varas, Iran
Varas, Mazandaran, Iran
Varas, Turkey
Las Varas, Chihuahua, Mexico
Vacas, Coahuila, Mexico
Varashát, Hungary

Units of measure
Vara, a seldom used Spanish and Portuguese unit of length
Portuguese customary units
Spanish customary units

People 

Antonio Varas
Alex Varas
Javi Varas
José Miguel Varas

Title 
Varas may refer to title or position of Wazir